Austin Krajicek and Tennys Sandgren were the defending champions. but decided not to compete.

Ryan Agar and Sebastian Bader won the title, defeating Bjorn Fratangelo and Mitchell Krueger in the final, 6–4, 7-6(7-3).

Seeds

Draw

Draw

References
 Main Draw

Tallahassee Tennis Challengerandnbsp;- Doubles
2014 Doubles
Tallahassee Tennis Challenger - Doubles